Audenge is a commune in the Gironde department in southwestern France.

Geography
The town is situated on the Arcachon Bay (Bassin d'Arcachon), between Lanton, Biganos and Marcheprime.

Population

Inhabitants of Audenge are called Audengeois.

History
Audenge's patron saint is Saint Yves, patron of fishermen.

See also
Communes of the Gironde department
Parc naturel régional des Landes de Gascogne

References

Communes of Gironde